

 
Gurindji is a locality in the Northern Territory of Australia located about  south of the territory capital of Darwin.

The locality consists of the following land (from north to south, then west to east):  
The Daguragu Aboriginal Land Trust, the Wave Hill and Cattle Creek pastoral leases, and the Wampana-Karlantijpa Aboriginal Land Trust,
The Hooker Creek Aboriginal Land Trust, and 
Land at the northern end of the Central Desert Aboriginal Land Trust.
The locality fully surrounds the communities of Daguragu, Kalkarindji and  Lajamanu.

The locality’s boundaries and name were gazetted on 4 April 2007.  Its boundaries were altered on 27 August 2014 to gain most of the land in the locality of Lajamanu with exception to that containing the Lajamanu community.  Its name is derived from “the Gurindji tribe of Aboriginals who walked off the Wave Hill Pastoral Station in protest of lack of wages.”

Gurindji includes the historic site, the Gurindji Wave Hill Walk Off Route, which was listed on the Northern Territory Heritage Register on 27 October 2006.

The 2016 Australian census which was conducted in August 2016 reports that Gurindji had 17 people living within its boundaries.

Gurindji is located within the federal division of Lingiari, the territory electoral division of Stuart and the local government areas of the Central Desert Region and the Victoria Daly Region.

References

Notes

Citations

Populated places in the Northern Territory
 Central Desert Region
 Victoria Daly Region
Gurindji